Richard William Hoffman (December 23, 1893 – July 6, 1975) was a U.S. Representative from Illinois.

Born in Chicago, Illinois, Hoffman was a veteran of the First World War. He engaged in the printing and publishing business. He owned and operated radio stations in Chicago, Illinois. He served as president of the board of education of J. Sterling Morton High School and Junior College 1933-1936 and 1939–1948.

Hoffman was elected as a Republican to the Eighty-first and to the three succeeding Congresses (January 3, 1949 – January 3, 1957). He was not a candidate for renomination in 1956 to the Eighty-fifth Congress.

He resumed former business activities. He resided in Riverside, Illinois. He died in Maywood, Illinois, July 6, 1975. He was interred in Forest Home Cemetery, Forest Park, Illinois.

References

1893 births
Military personnel from Illinois
1975 deaths
Burials at Forest Home Cemetery, Chicago
American military personnel of World War I
Republican Party members of the United States House of Representatives from Illinois
20th-century American politicians
People from Riverside, Illinois